Free Crack refers to

Albums 
 Lil Bibby - Free Crack
 Lil Bibby - Free Crack 2